"She's in Love with Mystery" is the second single released by the Thompson Twins. The song was only released as a single and was not included on their debut album. In 2008, Edsel Records reissued the band's first two albums, A Product Of... (Participation) (1981), and Set (1982) as a combined expanded double CD edition. The single and its b-sides were included on CD for the first time as bonus tracks.

The B-sides to the single are "Fast Food" and "Food Style".

Formats
7" UK vinyl single (Late 1)
Side A
"She's in Love with Mystery" - 2:33
Side B
"Fast Food" - 2:00
"Food Style" - 2:00

Personnel 
 Written by  T.T.
 Produced by the other Steve Taylor and T.T,
"She's In Love With Mystery" recorded at Point Studios
Engineer - Steve Dewey
 "Fast Food"/"Food Style" recorded at Mousehole Studios
 Engineer Pete Leggett
 Photo of Michelle by Ricky Knight
 Design by T.T.
 Artwork by Nicky

References

1980 singles
Thompson Twins songs
Songs written by Tom Bailey (musician)
1980 songs